The Predelta National Park is a national park of Argentina, located in south-west of the province of Entre Ríos, 6 km south from Diamante, in the Argentine Mesopotamia, at the beginning of the Paraná River Delta. The park was created on 13 January 1992 under the Law Nº 24.063, with an area 24.58 square kilometres to protect a sample of the Upper Delta of the Paraná, which belongs to the Paraná Delta and Islands Ecoregion.  The Predelta is the area where the sediments of the Paraná start forming islands, while the river itself splits into several major arms and many smaller watercourses.

References

Sources
Administración de Parques Nacionales - National Parks Administration of Argentina

National parks of Argentina
Protected areas of Entre Ríos Province
Paraná River
Protected areas established in 1992